Jim Schmedding (born February 10, 1946) is a former American football guard. He played for the San Diego Chargers from 1968 to 1970.

References

1946 births
Living people
American football guards
Weber State Wildcats football players
San Diego Chargers players